Louise Zarmati is an Australian archaeologist, educator, and author. She is most notable for pioneering Archaeology education in schools in Australia.

Education
In 1979, Zarmati received her Bachelors and Diploma of Education from the University of Sydney. She resumed her studies in 1992, earning her Masters in Archaeology from the University of Cambridge. Deakin University awarded Zarmati a PhD for her research on the history of pedagogy in Australian museums in 2012.

Career
Zarmati began her career as an English and history teacher at secondary schools. After five years she pursued a career in archaeology. She first began as a volunteer at Tel Dor in Israel in 1988. In 1990, she became a database designer for the Kavousi Project in Crete. During that time, she was an active member of the Women in Archaeology research group.

1993 brought her back to Australia, where she worked on the Sydney Cyprus Survey Project and the Dawes Point Archaeological Excavation. She returned to teaching in 1996, and during that time she wrote several archaeology textbooks. In addition to her textbooks, she also created programs for children to get involved with archaeology; for instance, on a site at Kerry Lodge.

In 2013, she returned to archaeology digs alongside Heather Burke. She now works as a lecturer in Humanities and Social Sciences at the University of Tasmania.

Zarmati has written on feminist theory and archaeology.

She was also one of the writers of the Australian Curriculum for history.

Select publications

References

Australian archaeologists
Australian women archaeologists
Living people
1958 births
Alumni of the University of Cambridge
Academic staff of the University of Tasmania
Deakin University alumni